Norberto Deolindo Vidigal (9 June 1964 – 19 December 2019) was an Angolan professional football midfielder and coach.

Football career
Vidigal was born Huíla, Portuguese Angola, and played for five clubs over a 20-year senior career. He started out at O Elvas CAD, achieving Primeira Liga promotion in 1986 and playing two seasons with the Alentejo side in that competition – their first and only.
	
After five years in the second division, with Louletano DC (two seasons) and U.D. Leiria (three), Vidigal returned to Elvas, with the team now in the third level. He then left for one-season stints with Associação Naval 1º de Maio and SC Vila Real also in that tier, then returned to his main club to close out his career, eventually representing it in all five major levels of Portuguese football; he retired at the age of 39.
 	
During four years, Vidigal worked as assistant coach with O Elvas, with the club in the fourth division.

Personal life and death
Vidigal had eight brothers and four sisters, four of the former also being footballers: Luís, Lito, Toni and Jorge. The first represented Portugal internationally, whilst the second opted to appear for Angola; his son, André, was also involved in the sport professionally.

Vidigal died on 19 December 2019 in Arronches, aged 55.

References

External links

1964 births
2019 deaths
People from Huíla Province
Angolan footballers
Association football midfielders
Primeira Liga players
Liga Portugal 2 players
Segunda Divisão players
O Elvas C.A.D. players
Louletano D.C. players
U.D. Leiria players
Associação Naval 1º de Maio players